Evolution is the fourth studio album by British boy band JLS. The album was released on 5 November 2012 through RCA Records. The album marks a new change in direction for the band, described as "a throwback to the '90s new jack swing/R&B-influenced music". The album was preceded by the single "Hottest Girl in the World", released on 21 October 2012.

Background
In March 2012, Oritsé Williams revealed that JLS had decided to work with top American producers for their fourth record, so they can give their fans a "great album". He claimed that "We're furthering our sound in that way." "We've been in the studio with people like Darkchild, and we've kind of gone back to new jack swing, and R&B on the album." He also revealed that they were working with "Mr. Bangladesh, who is known for his hip hop. We wanted to write with new people. We've got to give the fans a great album and we try to be the best we can." In April 2012, the band revealed that they were "going to Scandinavia and America over the next few weeks to put pen to paper." They also announced that the goal with the album was "to take us international."

In August 2012, the group revealed that the album would be titled Evolution, and would be released on 5 November 2012. Humes later stated the thinking behind the title was based on the fact that the group "wanted to come back with something that was different and that would give people something to talk about". On 3 September 2012, they announced that "Hottest Girl in the World" would serve as the lead single from the album, with a release date of 21 October 2012. On 21 August, the band began filming a music video for "Hottest Girl in the World". On the direction of the album. Aston Merrygold said; "We didn't go by any kind of guidelines or anything like that, we just made what felt right and we're really excited about it." On 11 September, the band unveiled the artwork for the album. The band also confirmed that a deluxe version of the album will be available, that will feature bonus and previously unreleased tracks. On 6 September, "Hottest Girl in the World" premiered on BBC Radio 1. The album features collaborations with both Bebe O'Hare and Tiffany Foxx, two independent artists who are well known on the underground circuit in the United States. Humes said of Tiffany Foxx's appearance: "Tiffany helped us with a spectacular take of Dessert. She cracked the vocals. We would love to see the version with her released as a single." In promotion of the album, the band performed "Hottest Girl in the World" on The X Factor on 21 October 2012, and premiered "Hold Me Down" on the edition of The Xtra Factor that followed. They also performed the track on Alan Carr: Chatty Man on 26 October 2012.

Critical reception

Upon release, Evolution received mixed to positive reviews from music critics. At review aggregate site Metacritic, it has an average score of 54 out of 100, based on five reviews, indicating "mixed to average" reviews. Shaun Kitchener of AMAZEPOP gave it a positive review, comparing it favourably to JLS's previous album Jukebox (2011). He said: "...it makes the group feel fresh again, like they're back at the forefront of the British boyband movement. They’re sensibly taking a step away from the half-cooked urbanised electro-pop that filled their last couple of albums; leaving the guitar-driven bubblegum choruses to One Direction and letting The Wanted get on with their own brand of club-ready ladpop." "Gotta Try It", "Hold Me Down" and "Give Me Life" were named the best tracks, with the latter being compared to Chris Brown. Kate Lucey of Sugarscape believed that JLS had "...upped their game for Evolution; released R&B, urban flavoured pop, and mastered it". She called it "their best record yet" and gave it a perfect 10/10 rating. Maximum Pop said: "All in all, a pretty solid album from Marvin & Co, as well as showing a significant progression of their overall musical style – they’ve moved from their pop leanings and have fully embraced their role as an R&B group, something that’ll help them separate from the growing pack of boybands out there, particularly against One Direction’s guitar-based power pop and The Wanted’s more clubby, experimental records. It’s an ‘Evolution’ alright, and we’re definitely along for the ride."

Writing for 4Music, Chris Younie was highly positive in his review: "We've always known [JLS] were suave and sophisticated, but this has never been more evident than on this latest album. The boys are back and they're cooler, crisper and cleverer than ever before. We approve." Lewis Corner of Digital Spy gave the album 3/5 stars. Regarding "Hottest Girl in the World", he said "...it was a relief to hear the group ditch their tired R&B-dance hybrids to serve up a cool slice of Justin Timberlake-styled pop. Their new attitude showed everyone that JLS are not shy about shaking off their boyish charm and transform into a charismatic manband." He was critical of other tracks "I Like It" and "Gotta Try It", but admitted that "Nevertheless, the result is an improvement on 2011's Jukebox and proves that JLS still have some mileage in them yet." In a review for AllMusic, Matt Collar said: "The fourth album from 2008 X Factor runner-up JLS, 2012's Evolution features more of the British boy band's slick, dance-oriented R&B. This time, JLS have teamed up with big-name producers Mr. Bangladesh (Usher, T-Pain) and Rodney Jerkins (Michael Jackson, Justin Bieber). The result is a synth-heavy album that evinces a kind of updated take on the '90s new jack swing influence that first inspired the group."

Track listing

"Dessert" contains an interpolation of "Freak Me" as performed by Silk.

Charts and certifications

Weekly charts

Year-end charts

Certifications

Release history

References

2012 albums
Epic Records albums
JLS albums
Albums produced by Midi Mafia
Albums produced by Rodney Jerkins
Albums produced by Bangladesh (record producer)
Albums produced by Harmony Samuels
Albums produced by the Runners
Albums produced by MNEK